Travis Shelton, better known by his stage name Visto or Head Hippie is an American rapper and singer-songwriter from Washington, DC.

Career 
On August 20, 2013, Visto released his first Album, “Before Euphoria" which included two popular singles, “How That Pxssy Taste” with rapper Phil Da Phuture and “Fxcking Around”. He continued to gain recognition for his science fictional visuals with his 2014 singles “Shinobi" and “On Fleek Tonight.” On August 4, 2015, singles “Smoke it Down", produced by The Democratz, and “Namaste", featuring Domani Harris and Australian sonstress Emmaline, were released. “Namaste” was coproduced by DJ Money and Mister Neek in the Minsta Cinema visuals. In 2016, Visto collaborated with Dew Baby to produce his hit single, Bu$$in Sudz, while working on his own single “I’m Good.” “I’m Good” was inspired by the results of the United States presidential election of 2016 and produced by The Democratz. In July 2016, Visto performed alongside other renowned artists Snoop Dogg and Wiz Khalifa at DOPE Fest. In April 2016, Visto shared the stage with fellow Hippie Life Krew member Pinky KillaCorn at Broccoli City Festival, featuring artists including Future and Jhene Aiko. In March 2016, Visto co-headlined WEDC's SXSW stage with Wale.

On March 21, 2017 Visto changed the life of a homeless artist, Carton Joyner by organizing an exhibition for Carton and bringing him off the streets. In addition, Visto helped Carton raise thousands of dollars for his artwork by setting up Carton’s social media accounts and GoFundMe.

On April 20, 2018 Visto released his long-awaited EP "Dopacabana".

Hippie Life Krew
In 2011, Visto, founded Hippie Life Krew, a DMV-based music and lifestyle collective. Since 2011, Hippie Life Krew has performed with other notable artists including Snoop Dogg, Currency,Raheem DeVaughn, Wale & many more . In 2015, Hippie Life Krew began GiveBag, an ongoing community initiative that aims to  provide winter clothing and hygiene items for the homeless. Hippie Life Krew also produces party and performance platforms such as Hippie Kabal, Free Spirits Sessions, and The Slow Burner.

Discography

Music

References

External links

American hip hop musicians
People from Cheverly, Maryland
American male rappers
Living people
1988 births
21st-century American rappers
21st-century American male musicians